Kalpana (18 July 1943 – 12 May 1979), born Sharat Lata, was an Indian actress who appeared in Kannada films. She was affectionately referred to as Minugu Taare ("A Shining Star") among the film fraternity. She was widely recognised as one of the greatest actresses of Kannada cinema who enjoyed both fan following and critical acclaim. She made her screen debut as a lead actress in the 1963 release Saaku Magalu directed by veteran B. R. Panthulu. During a career that spanned from the early 1960s to the late 1970s, Kalpana appeared in numerous commercially successful as well as critically appreciated films, many of which featured her alongside actor Rajkumar. She worked in a few Tamil, Tulu, Malayalam and Telugu films as well. Many of her successful films were female-centric, giving ample scope for her performance.

One of her best-known roles was that of "Kaveri" in the multi-award-winning film Sharapanjara released in 1971, a performance that won her the Karnataka State Film Award for Best Actress for that year. Her portrayal of a highly spirited and complex woman who fights her mental trauma won her the largest fan following ever for a Kannada actress. Her association with the veteran film maker Puttanna Kanagal both professionally and personally became the talk of the town back in the 1970s. They both went on to work in many commercially and critically successful films until they grew apart. In her career Kalpana received the Filmfare Award for Best Actress – Kannada once and the Karnataka State Film Award for Best Actress thrice.

Early life
Sharat Lata was born on 18 July 1943 to a Tulu-speaking couple, Krishnamurthy and Janakamma, in South Canara district of the erstwhile Madras Presidency (in present-day Dakshina Kannada, Karnataka). She was affectionately called Kalpana by the family. She had one sibling, brother Diwakar. Kalpana was drawn towards stage acting as a child after she spent much of her younger days with aunt Seethamma, an actress. She also trained in Indian classical dance during this time, winning an award at the State-level in a competition. Kalpana was drawn towards film acting after she was inspired by B. Saroja Devi's performance in the 1961 Kannada-language film Kittur Chennamma.

In the early 1960s, Kalpana left for Uttara Kannada with her mother and brother to study the basics of film and stage performances. She subsequently moved to Davangere, where upon meeting a relative, Shivakumar, she was introduced to playwright and filmmaker B. R. Panthulu, through actor Narasimharaju. Panthulu cast her in his 1963 Kannada film Saaku Magalu.

Career

In the romantic drama Saaku Magalu (1963), Kalpana played Uma, the foster sister of Raghuram, played by Rajkumar. She appeared in antagonistic characters in Kavaleradu Kulavondu (1965) and Bala Nagamma (1966). In Naandi (1964), she played the first wife of Rajkumar's character. The two would go on to become a frequent collaborators starring together in a total 19 Kannada films. Panthulu then made Chinnada Gombe (1964) with her. With opportunities in Kannada films drying up in the mid-1960s, Kalpana went on to appear in a handful Tamil and Malayalam-language films.

However, it was the 1967 released Belli Moda, directed by Puttanna Kanagal that brought her to the forefront. This portrayal of hers was instantly accepted and she soon was catapulted to the top among the actresses of the 1960s. She dominated the Kannada film industry during the late 1960s and 1970s and was critically acclaimed for some of her author-backed roles in movies like Sharapanjara, Gejje Pooje, Belli Moda, Eradu Kanasu, Kappu Bilupu, Bayalu Daari, Gandhada Gudi and Bangarada Hoovu. She worked with almost all the leading actors and directors of her time. Her most frequent co-stars were Rajkumar, Gangadhar and Udaya Kumar. P. Susheela and S. Janaki were the regular voices behind her songs in the films. She gave stiff competition to her contemporaries such as Jayanthi, Bharathi and Chandrakala among others.

Initially she was the most favoured actress of ace director Kanagal. Their association produced some of the finest movies in the history of Kannada cinema. Many of their films had strong, hard-hitting messages which were treasured in the cinema history. Kanagal groomed Kalpana to a great extent and though they were romantically linked by the media, industry folks are unanimous that their relationship was that of Guru-Shishya. However, they fell apart when Kanagal refused to offer her a pivotal role in Nagarahaavu. Kanagal went on to groom Aarathi while Kalpana featured in some average films later on. Her efforts to resurrect her career failed.
Even though her later movies with Rajkumar (Bidugade, Gandhada Gudi, Daari Tappida Maga and Eradu Kanasu), and Anant Nag (Bayalu Daari) were hits, they failed to resurrect her career. By 1977 she had no movies in hand. She then started focusing on drama companies in Uttara Karnataka and mainly worked in Gudigeri Basavaraj's drama company. With mounting debts and declining film offers, she went into deep depression.

She had also acted in a few Tamil and Telugu movies, such as Madras To Pondicherry and Sadhu Mirandal.These films were later made in Hindi as Bombay to Goa and Sadhu Aur Shaitan. Both the films were very successful at the box office. She also acted in Koti Channayya, a Tulu movie, directed by Vishu Kumar. She also acted in the Malayalam movie School Master. She lived for only 35 years of which she had spent 15 years in the Sandalwood film industry. She won the Karnataka state award for Best Actress thrice for Belli Moda, Hannele Chiguridaga and Sharapanjara. In her film career, she has acted in over eighty movies, of which the majority are in Kannada.

Legacy
The sway that actor Kalpana – who had won the title "Minugu Taare" (twinkling star) – held over Kannada film enthusiasts has not quite disappeared since her death. Known for playing complex and tragic roles, she died under mysterious circumstances. She ruled the Kannada film industry from 1967 until 1972.

V. Sreedhara, a teacher in Mysuru, has brought out a 1,114-page volume "Rajatha Rangada Dhruvathare",  chronicling her life and work spanning 79 films. It has details of the characters she played and opinions of various directors, co-artistes and writers. He started working on the book at 21 and completed it when he turned 27. "Even after working for so long, I have not completely understood the persona of Kalpana, as she was a complex person", he says.  The book was released in Bengaluru at a function organised by Karnataka Chalanachitra Academy.

Fashion icon
Kalpana was a fashion icon of her time. Her elegance, taste and sophistication in dressing could not be matched by other female stars of the time. The mega sleeve blouses, frill blouses are her contribution to Karnataka's style. Some of her fashion statements are elaborate hairdos, big rings on fingers, rich zari saris and chiffon saris, multiple bangles and long necklaces.

Death
Kalpana died on 12 May 1979. Her suicide was attributed to multiple causes from health issues, poor financial condition to failed romance, though nothing was established. As per post-mortem reports, she had consumed 56 sleeping pills. She had spent her last days at an inspection bungalow at Gotur near Sankeshwar, Belagavi, Karnataka.

Filmography
All films are in Kannada, unless otherwise noted.

Awards

Filmfare Awards South
 Best Actress – Kannada – Yaava Janmada Maitri (1972)

 Karnataka State Film Awards
 Best Actress – Belli Moda (1967)
 Best Actress – Hannele Chiguridaga (1968)
 Best Actress – Sharapanjara (1971)

References

Bibliography

External links 
 

1943 births
Indian film actresses
Kannada actresses
Actresses in Kannada cinema
1979 suicides
Actresses in Malayalam cinema
Actresses in Telugu cinema
Drug-related suicides in India
Filmfare Awards South winners
20th-century Indian actresses
People from Dakshina Kannada district
Actresses in Tamil cinema
Actresses from Karnataka
1979 deaths